Penallt Halt was a request stop on the former Wye Valley Railway. It was opened on 1 August 1931 and closed in 1959. Penallt Halt and Redbrook Station were the closest stations on the line with only Penallt Viaduct separating them. Penallt Halt was close to the village of Redbrook.

References

Disused railway stations in Monmouthshire
Former Great Western Railway stations
Railway stations in Great Britain opened in 1931
Railway stations in Great Britain closed in 1959